Water polo was only contested for men at the 1970 Asian Games in Bangkok, Thailand.

Medalists

Results

Preliminary round

Group A

Group B

Final round

Semifinals

Bronze medal match

Gold medal match

References
Results
 Asian Games water polo medalists

 
1970 Asian Games events
1970
Asian Games
1970 Asian Games